Daxing Township is a township under the administration of Zhaoyuan County, Heilongjiang, China. , it has 6 villages under its administration.

References 

Township-level divisions of Heilongjiang
Zhaoyuan County